August "Gus" Shallix  (March 29, 1858 in Paderborn, Germany – October 28, 1937 in Cincinnati) was a professional baseball player who played pitcher in the Major Leagues from 1884–1885. He played for the Cincinnati Red Stockings.

External links

1858 births
1935 deaths
Major League Baseball pitchers
Cincinnati Red Stockings (AA) players
19th-century baseball players
Major League Baseball players from Germany
Nashville Americans players
Sportspeople from Paderborn